Morten Christensen may refer to:

Morten Christensen (tennis) (born 1965), former Danish tennis player 
Morten Stig Christensen (born 1958), former Danish handball player
Morten Ring Christensen (born 1990), Norwegian freestyle competitor in skicross

See also
Morten Christiansen (born 1978), Danish professional football midfielder